The Democratic Party of the Virgin Islands is a political party in the U.S. Virgin Islands, and is affiliated with the Democratic Party at the nationwide level. It won the gubernatorial elections of 2018 when its candidate Albert Bryan was elected with 54.5%. At the last elections in November 2018, the party won 13 out of 15 seats in the Legislature of the Virgin Islands. Out of 51,000 registered voters in the U.S. Virgin Islands, approximately 30,000 voters are registered Democrats.

According to political scientist Malik Sekou of the University of the Virgin Islands, the Democratic Party of the Virgin Islands is the strongest party in the U.S. Virgin Islands, with the other significant parties (Independent Citizens Movement and the Republican Party of the Virgin Islands) failing to be competitive in gubernatorial elections for over three decades. Politicians affiliated with the party have dominated the legislature for the last 30 years, served as governors for 25 years out of 33 years from 1987 to 2020, and served as the Delegate to Congress 29 years out of 33 years during the same span.

References 

 
Political parties in the United States Virgin Islands
Political parties established in 1948
1948 establishments in the United States Virgin Islands